Suki Chan (born 1977 in Hong Kong) is an artist and filmmaker whose work uses light, moving image and sound to explore our perception of reality.

 She is drawn to light as a physical phenomenon, and the role it plays in our constantly shifting daily experience of our environment, be it urban or rural. Her pieces vary from photography, film installation to mixed-media sculptures.

Chan is based in London and is represented by Tintype Gallery. She is also a visiting lecturer at the Royal College of Art.

Education
1996: Foundation in Art and Design- Winchester School of Art

1999: BA Fine Art- Goldsmiths

2008: MA Fine Art Chelsea

Commissions
Chan has been commissioned by various organisations to produce work for both galleries and public spaces; including Science Gallery Dublin, Film and Video Umbrella, Centre for Chinese Contemporary Art, The Young Foundation, Art on the Underground and Aspex Gallery.

Collections
Chan's work is included in the collections of the Museum of London, University of Salford Arts Collection, University of the Arts Art Collection, David Roberts Art Foundation and the Ingram Collection.

Honours
In 2008, she was nominated for the Northern Art Prize and in 2010, she was shortlisted for the Renaissance Art Prize.

In 2009, Chan was one of the six young British artists featured in the BBC's series School of Saatchi. On the show, Tracey Emin who said that her work was better than some established artists. "The film's flipping brilliant," she said. "There's a few artists' names come to mind when I saw it but this knocks spots off them." Chan's work also received a positive review in The Guardian newspaper from the art critic Robert Clark who wrote "Suki Chan's art makes us wonder in more ways than one. It enables us to treasure the wonder of the world through daring to suggest the dreadful cost of the loss of such wonderful phenomena."

Residencies
In partnership with Bluecoat and Arts Council England, Chan was invited to be one of the artists in residence at the Belong care village, Crewe. Chan interviewed residents which formed the basis of her project, CONSCIOUS.

In 2005, Chan completed a residency at the Osteopathic Centre for Children, producing 1,000 origami cranes for their permanent installation at the charity's Manchester base.

References

External links
Official website
Suki Chan at the Centre for Chinese Contemporary Art Archive & Library
Suki Chan at the Asia Art Archive

1977 births
Living people
British contemporary artists
Hong Kong people
Alumni of Goldsmiths, University of London
Alumni of Chelsea College of Arts
English mixed media artists
Conceptual artists
Women conceptual artists
English curators
English people of Hong Kong descent
21st-century women artists